Gunnar Sjöberg (25 March 1909 – 8 June 1977) was a Swedish film actor.

Selected filmography

 Russian Flu (1937) - Delegat från Sundsvall (uncredited)
 John Ericsson, Victor of Hampton Roads (1937) - Seaman
 Styrman Karlssons flammor (1938) - Smuggler (uncredited)
 A Woman's Face (1938) - Harald Berg
 Variety Is the Spice of Life (1939) - Guest at the birthday party (uncredited)
 Gläd dig i din ungdom (1939) - Helgo
 Whalers (1939) - Tore, sailor (uncredited)
 Emilie Högquist (1939) - Knut Almlöf
 Stål (1940) - Lars Gouveng
 June Night (1940) - Nils Asklund
 With Open Arms (1940) - Lawyer (uncredited)
 Gentlemannagangstern (1941) - Doctor (uncredited)
 Landstormens lilla argbigga (1941) - Engineer
 Första divisionen (1941) - Kapten Hansson
 Goransson's Boy (1941) - Göran Bryhme, Pelle's father (uncredited)
 Woman on Board (1941) - Blomqvist
 Scanian Guerilla (1941) - Långe-Tuve
 The Case of Ingegerd Bremssen (1942) - Dr. Ivarsson
 General von Döbeln (1942) - En officer
 Ride Tonight! (1942) - Foreign peasant
 The Heavenly Play (1942) - God's Angel (uncredited)
 I brist på bevis (1943) - Defense lawyer
 Men of the Navy (1943) - Ingeniör Kärre
 Elvira Madigan (1943) - Lt. Frans
 Prästen som slog knockout (1943) - Artist
 Imprisoned Women (1943) - Pastor Brobäck
 Life and Death (1943) - Sergeant Lundblad
 En flicka för mej (1943) - Narrator (voice, uncredited)
 I Killed (1943) - Martin
 The Brothers' Woman (1943) - Nicklas Botvide
 His Excellency (1944) - Max Karbe
 Den heliga lögnen (1944) - Axel Dehlin
 Prince Gustaf (1944) - Carl Nyraeus
 The Rose of Tistelön (1945) - Arnman senior, Arves far
 Black Roses (1945) - Harald Vestermark
 The Serious Game (1945) - Baron Freutiger
 Barnen från Frostmofjället (1945) - Vicar
 Youth in Danger (1946) - Bo Wärn
 The Night Watchman's Wife (1947) - Managing Director (uncredited)
Sin (1948) - Martin Alm
 Two Stories Up (1950) - Reverend
 Sabotage (1952) - Panter - Resistance Leader
 Han glömde henne aldrig (1952) - Nilsson
 Barabbas (1953) - Supervisor at Copper Mine on Cyprus (uncredited)
 The Shadow (1953) - Doctor
 The Great Adventure (1953) - Narrator (Anders as an adult) (voice)
 Seger i mörker (1954) - Gustaf De Laval
 Salka Valka (1954) - Narrator (voice, uncredited)
 Sir Arne's Treasure (1954) - King Johan III
 Den glade skomakaren (1955) - Hjalmar Hjalle Ek
 Seventh Heaven (1956) - Fader Bernhard Svanström, präst i Assisi
 The Staffan Stolle Story (1956) - Herr Lefverhielm
 Night Light (1957) - Narrator / Policeman (uncredited)
 Synnöve Solbakken (1957) - Doctor
 Wild Strawberries (1957) - Sten Alman / The Examiner
 A Goat in the Garden (1958) - Fabian
 Brink of Life (1958) - Dr. Nordlander
 Playing on the Rainbow (1958) - Prosecutor
 The Die Is Cast (1960)  - Leonard Brett
 The Devil's Eye (1960) - Marquis Giuseppe Maria de Macopanza
 Do You Believe in Angels? (1961) - Karl-Evert Raeder
 Hällebäcks gård (1961) - Johan
 Pärlemor (1961) - Priest
 Hide and Seek (1963) - Felici

References

External links

1909 births
1977 deaths
Swedish male film actors
20th-century Swedish male actors
Male actors from Stockholm